David Amadou "Papys" M'Bodji (born July 13, 1984) is a retired Senagalese footballer who played as a centre forward.

References

External links 
 

1984 births
Living people
People from Kaolack
Association football forwards
Senegalese footballers
Senegal international footballers
Olympique de Marseille players
AS Cannes players
US Créteil-Lusitanos players
FC Lorient players
RC Strasbourg Alsace players
Clermont Foot players
Ligue 1 players
Ligue 2 players